Lebovic Centre for Arts & Entertainment – Nineteen on the Park is an arts and entertainment venue in Stouffville, Ontario and one of the few historic buildings remaining in the town.

Civic Use
Built in 1896, the two storey brick buildings features Romanesque Revival elements.

Originally a market/concert hall, it was later used as a movie theatre, bowling alley and billiard hall, garage before becoming Stouffville Town Hall and remained in use until the late 1990s (relocated to 37 Sandiford Drive and now at 111 Sandiford Drive) and used by artists until the mid 2000s.

Arts Centre
The building was full renovated and converted as a multi-use venue (152 seat Great Hall theatre and community room) that opened in 2009. The building's naming rights is named for local home builder Lebovic Homes.

See also

 Stouffville GO Station (C. 1869)

References

External links
 Lebovic Centre for Arts & Entertainment – Nineteen on the Park

Buildings and structures in Whitchurch-Stouffville
Arts centres in Canada
Romanesque Revival architecture in Canada
City and town halls in Ontario
Clock towers in Canada
1896 establishments in Ontario
Buildings and structures completed in 1896
Designated heritage properties in Ontario